Ossie Langfelder (August 2, 1926 – October 21, 2015) was the Democratic mayor of Springfield, Illinois, the state capital and seat of Sangamon County. He served from 1987 to 1995.  He was the father of Jim Langfelder, who became the Mayor of Springfield in 2015.

Biography 
Langfelder was born in 1926 in Austria, the son of a Jewish father and a Lutheran mother. In 1939, shortly after Adolf Hitler's invasion of Austria, the family fled to Switzerland, moving to the United States and settling in Springfield in 1940. Langfelder served in the United States Army from 1945 to 1946. He married Mary "Midge" Dunham in 1952; the couple would have 13 children. One of them, Jim, would be elected mayor of Springfield in 2015. Another, Josh, would be elected Sangamon County Recorder in 2008. Langfelder died in 2015 at the age of 89, six months after his son Jim was elected mayor.

References

1926 births
2015 deaths
Mayors of Springfield, Illinois
Illinois Democrats
Jewish emigrants from Austria to the United States after the Anschluss
20th-century American politicians
United States Army personnel of World War II